Ramán Járaš (Belarusian: Рама́н ́Яраш) – Belarusian musician.

Biography 
Ramán Járaš was born in May 1978 in Brahin District, Homiel Voblaść. After April 1986 his family moved twice further from Chernobil and once moved back. 

Started playing guitar at university. Learned singing together with his friends in "Kudźmień" singing group and from traditional singers during ethnographic expeditions. Was inspired to start playing harmonica by Bob Dylan.

Discography 
 Zināt. Raudāt. Dziedāt. (2011)

Zināt. Raudāt. Dziedāt. 
Poetry by Latvian writer Jānis Jaunsudrabiņš was used as the lyrics. All arrangements and translations were made by Raman himself. He also played all musical parts. Jaunsudrabiņš's painting and Latvian language were used to design the cover.

Collaboration 
 Radio Liberty project – "Bardy svabody»
 Concert program "Kupała – Karatkievič" (together with Andrej Kaścień and Viktar Siamaška)

References

External links 
 VK
 Facebook
 Playlist on Youtube

Belarusian musicians
1978 births
Living people
Maxim Tank Belarusian State Pedagogical University alumni